Lo Ta-yu (born 20 July 1954), also known as Luo Dayou and Law Tai-yau, is a Taiwanese singer and songwriter. During the 1980s, Lo became one of the most influential Mandopop singer-songwriters with his melodic lyrics and love songs, and his witty social and political commentary that he infused in his more political songs, often to the point that some of his songs were suppressed in Taiwan and Mainland China during the 1980s. He is recognized as a cultural icon in Taiwan, Hong Kong, and Mainland China.

Stylistically, Lo defies classification, though his contribution to the Taiwan campus folk song genre was most significant. His early music in particular shows strong folk roots, and many of his songs tap into native Taiwanese cultural influences. Some songs are reminiscent of 1950s American diner and soda shop rock, and others exhibit a 1970s lounge lizard growl. What captured the hearts of a generation, however, were his lyrics, touching on issues of life, attitudes, social responsibility, and the political problems of both Chinese Mainland and Taiwan with an underhandedly critical strain of dark humor. The lyrical style is not particularly artsy or complex, but rather conversational; the cleverness comes in the meaning, not how the words are put together.

Life and career
Lo was born in Taipei on 20 July 1954 to an upper-class family. He complied with his family's wishes to finish medical school by graduating from the China Medical University in Taichung, but decided to abandon a career as a physician to pursue a singing and songwriting career.

In 1982, Lo released his debut album Zhī hū zhě yě (之乎者也), the title of which consists solely of grammatical particles from Classical Chinese. A ground breaking album that broadened the horizons of Chinese music and set a new model for Chinese songwriting, it spun off hits including not only the title song, but also "Lukang, the Little Town" (鹿港小鎮), "Love Song 1980" (戀曲1980), and "Childhood" (童年). Singing songs infused with brazen commentary on the social scene of Taiwan at that time and sporting sunglasses, his debut sparked buzz and heated discussion about the issues that his songs raised in Taiwan, such as Confucian pedantry and urban emptiness.

He followed with his next album in 1983, Master of the Future (未來的主人翁), which features several songs: the title song which warns the listener of a future run by children without morals or humanity and "72 Transformations" (現象七十二變), and "Orphan of Asia" (亞細亞的孤兒) which shares its title with Wu Zhuoliu's novel about the Japanese occupation of Taiwan.

In 1985, inspired by the success of the charity single We Are the World by USA for Africa, Lo wrote "Tomorrow Will Be Better" (明天會更好), a highly successful charity single of his own to celebrate the 40th anniversary of Taiwan's independence from Japanese colonial rule. It was ultimately performed by over 60 different artists from Taiwan, Hong Kong, Singapore, and Malaysia, including Tsai Chin, Chyi Chin, Chyi Yu, Sarah Chen, Eric Moo, Fei Yu-Ching, Angus Tung, and Jonathan Lee.

Lover/Comrade (愛人同志) was Lo's next album, released in 1988. In addition to the title song which uses political slogans in the context of a love song, the album also included "Love Song 1990" (戀曲1990), one of his most famous love songs that was written 6 years after he had written "Love Song 1980."

In 1991, he wrote "Pearl of the Orient" (東方之珠), regarded as one of his most famous songs which sings praises to Hong Kong as a symbolic haven from the perils of the Pacific and implores Hong Kong not to lose its Chinese identity in the face of rapid modernization and British colonization at that time. He also wrote "Queen's Road East" (皇后大道東), a Cantonese song he sang with Ram Chiang that satirizes the impending Hong Kong handover in 1997.

In 2004, Lo formally relinquished his US citizenship to protest the introduction to the US House of Representatives of a resolution regarding the deployment of Taiwanese marines to Iraq. "[W]hen US representatives introduced a resolution requesting that Taiwan send marines to Iraq, I realized that while the US often stresses peaceful negotiations across the Taiwan Strait, the US government is the third party that stands in the way of truly peaceful negotiation," Lo said.

On Sunday, 25 May 2008, at 7 pm PST, Lo held a live concert at San Jose State University Event Center. The concert, entitled "Join 'N Sing", was a celebration of the newly elected president of Taiwan, Ma Ying-jeou. There were three special guests at this show: Kao Ling Fung, Hsu Nai Ling, and Cindi Chaw Yong Hua. This show turned into a charity fundraiser for the earthquake victims of Sichuan, China.

Discography
Zhi Hu Zhe Ye 之乎者也 (1982)
Master of the Future 未來的主人翁 (1983)
Home 家  (1984)
Youth Movement 青春舞曲 (1986)
Lover-Comrade 愛人同志 (1988)
Brilliant Days 閃亮的日子 (1989)
The Year to Say Farewell 告別的年代 (1989)
Queen's Road East 皇后大道東 (1991)
Hometown 原鄉 (1991)
Capital 首都 (1992)
Love Song 2000 戀曲二〇〇〇 (1994)
再會吧！素蘭 (Zài huì ba! Sù lán) (1995)
寶島鹹酸甜 (Bǎodǎo xián suān tián) (1996)
昨日遗书 (Zuórì yì shū) (2002)
昨日至今 (Zuórì zhì jīn) (2002)
Beautiful Island 美麗島 (2004)
Home lll 家lll (2017)
Encore 安可曲 (2022)

References

External links
LoTaYu.net 
Musical biography of Lo Ta-yu 
Dating Luo Dayou in Beijing 

Lo Da Yu live in concert, Sunday, 25 May 2008 @ 7pm @ San Jose State Event Center, with special guests: Kao Ling Fung, Hsu Nai Ling, & Cindi Chaw Yong Hua

1954 births
Living people
Taiwanese people of Hakka descent
Taiwanese male singers
Musicians from Taipei
Former United States citizens
Taiwanese Mandopop singer-songwriters
Taiwanese rock musicians
Hakka musicians
People with acquired American citizenship
Superband (band) members
Cantonese-language singers of Taiwan